The inaugural meeting of The Gemmological Association of Australia (GAA) was held in the School of Arts Building, Pitt Street, Sydney on 29 October 1945.

The Association was formed to promote the education of the science of gemmology and the study of gemstones as a safeguard to the public against spurious stones.

The association has divisions in six states of Australia, the smallest being Tasmania Division.

References

External links 
 GAA Web site 
 Tasmania Division http://www.gem.org.au/states/tas/

Organizations established in 1945
Gemology
Organisations based in Sydney